Arcadie Gherasim (born 24 August 1957) is a journalist from the Republic of Moldova. He was general director of Moldovan Public Television Moldova 1 and editor-in-chief of news programs for Radio Moldova. Arcadie Gherasim works for Vocea Basarabiei and Timpul de dimineaţă.

Biography
Arcadie Gherasim was born on 24 August 1957. He was a reporter with TeleRadio-Moldova, as well as with Moldova's National Public Radio (1979–1986). Gherasim worked his way up in the company as departmental head, deputy editor-in-chief, and editor-in-chief of news programs for Radio Moldova. Between July 1999 and June 2000, he was general director of Moldovan Public Television, Moldova 1.

He is a deputy editor-in-chief of Timpul de dimineaţă, a major Moldovan newspaper. He is also the voice of Forum, a radio show on Radio Vocea Basarabiei. Gherasim also teaches economic journalism at the State University of Moldova. Between 2002 and 2006, he was a producer with Euro TV Moldova.

References

External links 
 Gherasim Arcadie
 Forum Radio - cu Arcadie Gherasim

Moldova State University alumni
Academic staff of Moldova State University
Moldovan journalists
Male journalists
Euronova Media Group
Romanian people of Moldovan descent
Living people
1957 births
Teleradio-Moldova